Otto Steiger (4 August 1909 – 10 May 2005) was a Swiss writer and radio news speaker.

Biography

Steiger was born in Uetendorf, Thun, Switzerland in 1909.

His third novel, Portrait of a respected man (1952), was condemned by critics as propaganda for communism. This book was translated into Russian without Steiger's knowledge and sold 300,000 copies.

References

External links

1909 births
2005 deaths
People from Thun District
Swiss writers in German